Bisgaardia miroungae is a bacterium from the genus of Bisgaardia which has been isolated from the oral cavity of an elephant seal (Mirounga angustirostris) from the Marine Mammal Center in the United States.

References

External links
Type strain of Bisgaardia miroungae at BacDive -  the Bacterial Diversity Metadatabase

Pasteurellales
Bacteria described in 2015